Automattic Inc. is an American global distributed company which was founded in August 2005 and is most notable for WordPress.com (a freemium blogging service), as well as its contributions to WordPress (an open source blogging software). The company's name is a play on founder Matt Mullenweg's first name and automatic.

Automattic raised US$846 million in six funding rounds. The last round of US$288 million was closed in February 2021. A subsequent private stock buyback valued the company at US$7.5 billion.

The company had 2,002 employees as of March 2022. Its remote working culture was the topic of a participative journalism project by Scott Berkun, resulting in the 2013 book The Year Without Pants: WordPress.com and the Future of Work.

CEO Matt Mullenweg allows company employees to work from wherever they want, whenever they want.

History
On January 11, 2006, it was announced that Toni Schneider would be leaving Yahoo! to become CEO of Automattic. He was previously CEO of Oddpost before it was acquired by Yahoo!, where he had continued as a senior executive.

In April 2006 Automattic's Regulation D filing showed it had raised approximately $1.1 million in funding, which Mullenweg addressed in his blog. Investors were Polaris Ventures, True Ventures, Radar Partners.

On 18 October 2007, Automattic acquired Gravatar.

On September 23, 2008, Automattic announced acquiring IntenseDebate. Two months later, on November 15, 2008, Automattic acquired PollDaddy.

On September 9, 2010, Automattic gave the WordPress trademark and control over bbPress and BuddyPress to the WordPress Foundation.

On April 4, 2014, Automattic acquired Longreads.

On May 19, 2015, Automattic announced the acquisition of WooThemes, including their flagship product WooCommerce.

On November 21, 2016, Automattic, via a subsidiary company (Knock Knock, WHOIS There) managed the launch and later development of the .blog gTLD, becoming domain registrars.

In 2017, Automattic announced that it would close its San Francisco office, which had served as an optional co-working space for its employees alongside similar spaces near Portland, Maine and in Cape Town, South Africa.

On June 21, 2018, Automattic acquired Atavist and its magazine.

On May 21, 2019, Automattic acquired Prospress, which provided a number of popular WooCommerce extensions and tools.

On August 12, 2019, Automattic acquired Tumblr from Verizon Media.

On August 16, 2019, Automattic acquired Zero BS CRM and rebranded it a year later to Jetpack CRM.

On September 19, 2019, Automattic announced a Series D funding round of $300 million from Salesforce, bringing the post-money valuation of the company to $3 billion.

On February 8, 2021, Automattic acquired content analytics platform parse.ly for WPVIP, Founder Matt Mullenweg announced on his blog.

On June 14, 2021, Automattic acquired journaling app Day One.

On July 16, 2021, Automattic acquired the podcasts app Pocket Casts.

Projects
Other projects include:

 After the Deadline – online proofreading tool now built into WordPress.com and Jetpack
 Atavist  – multimedia publishing platform
 Akismet – anti-comment spam system capable of integration with many blogging platforms and forums
 bbPress – forum software
 blo.gs – RSS feed aggregator
 BuddyPress – social networking plugin suite
 Cloudup – file sharing application
 Crowdsignal (formerly Polldaddy) – polls and survey tools
 GlotPress – collaborative translation tool
 Gravatar – globally recognized avatars
 HappyTools - resource planning software 
 IntenseDebate – blog comment hosting service that was launched as a private beta in January 2007 by Co-Founders Jon Fox, Isaac Keyet, and Josh Morgan, and launched as an open beta on October 30, 2007. On September 23, 2008, Automattic announced its acquisition of IntenseDebate's properties, and returned to private beta until November of that year. In 2007, IntenseDebate was selected to be part of the first class of Techstars, a Boulder, Colorado-based startup accelerator
 Jetpack - WordPress plugin providing a range of basic services (backup, speed, stats, etc.)
 Longreads – original reporting and journalism aggregator
 Mongoose ODM – mongodb object modeling for node.js
 Pocket Casts – app for listening to podcasts on iOS, Android, macOS, Windows and the web
 Poster – blogging app for IOS
 Ping-O-Matic – pinging service
 Simplenote – note-taking and sync service acquired by Automattic in 2013 and later open-sourced
 Scroll Kit – code-free web design tool
 Tumblr - Microblogging platform
 VaultPress – backup and security service for WordPress sites
 VideoPress – hosted HD video for WordPress sites
 WooCommerce – eCommerce plugin for WordPress with a marketplace for extensions 
 WPVIP – Enterprise WordPress hosting, support, and consulting

References

External links

 
2005 establishments in California
American companies established in 2005
Companies based in San Francisco
Free software companies
Privately held companies based in California
Remote companies
Software companies based in the San Francisco Bay Area
Software companies established in 2005
Software companies of the United States
WordPress